The Akwamu people are an Akan ethnic group in Ghana. They are native around the border between the Eastern and Volta Regions. The Akwamu founded an empire from the 17th and 18th centuries until British colonization in 1886. Olsen states in his 1996 research that Akwamu populace in Ghana numbered over 50,000.

References 

Ethnic groups in Ghana